George Day (1 October 1879 – 7 August 1953) was a New Zealand cricketer. He played in one first-class match for Wellington in 1903/04.

See also
 List of Wellington representative cricketers

References

External links
 

1879 births
1953 deaths
New Zealand cricketers
Wellington cricketers
Cricketers from Wellington City